Elkhorn is a neighborhood and former city on the western edge of the city of Omaha, Nebraska, United States. The population was 6,062 at the 2000 census and was estimated by the Census Bureau at 8,192 in 2005. It was named after the Elkhorn River. Elkhorn was once an independent city in Douglas County until it was annexed by Omaha in 2007.

History
Elkhorn was platted in 1867 when the Union Pacific Railroad was extended to that point.

Demographics
As of the census of 2000, there were 6,062 people, 2,000 households, and 1,681 families residing in Elkhorn. The population density was 1,619.4 inhabitants per square mile (625.8/km2). There were 2,034 housing units at an average density of 543.4 per square mile (210.0/km2). The racial makeup of the area was 98.75% White, 0.13% African American, 0.25% Native American, 0.33% Asian, 0.20% from other races, and 0.35% from two or more races. Hispanic or Latino people of any race were 1.27% of the population.

There were 2,000 households, out of which 46.3% had children under the age of 18 living with them, 73.8% were married couples living together, 7.6% had a female householder with no husband present, and 16.0% were non-families. 13.7% of all households were made up of individuals, and 4.4% had someone living alone who was 65 years of age or older. The average household size was 2.97 and the average family size was 3.28.

The median income for a household in Elkhorn was $67,234, and the median income for a family was $76,206. Males had a median income of $52,361, versus $31,655 for females. The per capita income for Elkhorn was $29,129. About 1.6% of families and 2.1% of the population were below the poverty line, including 3.0% of those under age 18 and 4.2% of those age 65 or over.

Annexation
 Elkhorn, founded in 1865 by George Crawford and platted in 1867, was an independent municipality until it was annexed by the city of Omaha in 2005. In an attempt to prevent the annexation, Elkhorn almost simultaneously annexed several surrounding subdivisions in an attempt to bring the city's population above 10,000 citizens. Under state law, that would have prevented the city's forcible annexation by Omaha. On January 12, 2007, the Nebraska Supreme Court ruled in favor of Omaha, saying "…we conclude that Elkhorn ceased to exist as a separate municipality on March 24, 2005, the date that Omaha's annexation ordinance became effective." The United States Supreme Court denied Elkhorn's request to hear the case on February 22, 2007.

Omaha Mayor Mike Fahey said he tried for years to work with Elkhorn, whereby Elkhorn would not be annexed if the city did no further annexing of its own. Elkhorn representatives did not consider that a fair proposal and refused. Omaha began the process of annexing Elkhorn. The two municipalities went to court as Elkhorn attempted to block the forcible annexation by Omaha. It was not until after losing the first round in the courts that Elkhorn offered to reach an agreement with Omaha. Omaha, having won in the courts and already financially invested in the court fights, refused to deal with Elkhorn and continued the annexation process.

The final Elkhorn city council meeting was held February 27, 2007. Elkhorn ceased to be an independent municipality on March 1, 2007.

Education
Elkhorn Public Schools operates the area public schools.

References

Further reading
Maps of Elkhorn:
 CITY OF ELKHORN v. CITY OF OMAHA
  - Pages 1 and 2
  - Pages 21 and 22

External links
 Photos of Elkhorn at Wikimedia Commons
 Elkhorn Historical Society
 Online Extra: The Elkhorn-Omaha annexation - Omaha World-Herald

West Omaha, Nebraska
History of Omaha, Nebraska by community area
Populated places established in 1865
Populated places disestablished in 2007
Former municipalities in Nebraska